Manuel Hector "Manny" Coto is an American writer, director and producer of films and television programs.

Coto was the executive producer and showrunner of Star Trek: Enterprise in its final season, and executive producer of four seasons of 24. He was an executive producer and writer for the fifth season of the Showtime TV series Dexter.

Career
Coto graduated from the American Film Institute and has experience in the sci-fi and fantasy genres. In 1990, Brian Helgeland and Coto sold a script, The Ticking Man, for $1 million, but the film was never made. He wrote and directed an episode of Tales from the Crypt and also wrote an episode for and produced The Outer Limits when it was revived on Showtime in 1995. He was given the chance to create and write a series for Showtime after The Outer Limits was cancelled. The resulting series was Odyssey 5 and starred Peter Weller (Coto would later cast Weller in roles on Enterprise, 24, and Dexter).

Coto joined the writing crew of Enterprise in 2003, when the show was in its third season; his episodes include "Similitude", "Chosen Realm" and "Azati Prime". He became a co-executive producer later that season. In the fourth season he became executive producer of the show, alongside series creators Rick Berman and Brannon Braga.  According to his bio on StarTrek.com, he has been a fan of Star Trek all his life and once wrote a Star Trek comic book.

After that he became executive producer on the fifth, sixth, seventh, and the eighth and final season of 24.

In 2010 Coto joined the crew of Showtime drama series Dexter as a writer and executive producer for the fifth season. He continued to work as a writer and executive producer for the show's sixth and seventh seasons, airing 2011 and 2012.

Films Coto has directed include Cover Up, Dr. Giggles, and Star Kid.

He is the creator and executive producer of NeXt, which premiered on October 6, 2020 on Fox.

Coto is currently the Executive Producer of American Horror Story and American Horror Stories, having written numerous episodes of both series. 
He directed the well-received episode, "Feral", from American Horror stories season one, and wrote the season opener, "Dollhouse", for season two.

Personal life
Coto married Robin Trickett on December 27, 2004 in Venice, Italy.

Filmography (as director)

Films

Television

Writing credits

References

External links

American people of Cuban descent
American male screenwriters
American television directors
American television writers
Living people
People from Orlando, Florida
Showrunners
Film directors from Florida
AFI Conservatory alumni
American male television writers
1961 births
Screenwriters from Florida
Bishop Moore High School alumni
Television producers from Florida